The Top Holiday Albums chart is a seasonal chart published weekly by Billboard during the holiday months of each year. It tracks the best-selling Christmas and holiday albums in the United States. Throughout the 2000s, many albums, compilation albums, extended plays, and soundtrack albums reached the top spot of the chart.  Italian opera singer and songwriter Andrea Bocelli received the first number one of the 2010s with his album My Christmas (2009).

Chart history

See also 
 Billboard Christmas Holiday Charts
 Billboard Top Christmas Albums of the 1990s
 List of best-selling Christmas albums in the United States
 List of Billboard Holiday Songs number ones of the 2001-2010
 List of Billboard Top Holiday Albums number ones of the 2010s

References

External links 
 Current Top Holiday Albums chart at Billboard

Holiday albums
United States Holiday Albums